Ángel Papadopoulos Dordi (17 October 1944 in Huelva – 4 May 2010 in Madrid) was a Spanish circus performer.

On 3 May 2010 he was admitted to the University Hospital of Alcorcón after suffering multiple cardiac arrests. He died on 4 May as a result of a final heart attack.

Notes

1944 births
2010 deaths
Lion tamers
Spanish circus performers
Spanish entertainers
Spanish people of Greek descent
Spanish Roman Catholics